Claverie is a surname. Notable people with the surname include:

Carlos Claverie (born 1996), Venezuelan swimmer
Cédric Claverie (born 1976), French judoka
Charles Claverie (1949–2005), better known as Charles Rocket, American actor
Pierre Claverie (1938–1996), French Roman Catholic priest

See also
Isabelle Boni-Claverie, French screenwriter and film director